Kosala is a genus of moths in the family Lasiocampidae. The genus was erected by Frederic Moore in 1879.

Species
Kosala flavosignata (Moore, 1879) (India, Vietnam)
Kosala kadoi Hauenstein, S. Ihle, Sinjaev & Zolotuhin, 2011 (Bhutan)
Kosala reducta Zolotuhin & Witt, 2000 (Vietnam)
Kosala rufa Hampson, 1892 (Thailand)
Kosala sanguinea Moore, 1879 (India, Thailand)

References

External links

 - with images

Lasiocampidae

sv:Kosala